Melanophryniscus stelzneri, commonly known as the bumblebee toad or black-and-yellow walking toad, is a species of toad in the family Bufonidae which is endemic to Argentina. It is popular in the pet trade.

Description 
The bumblebee toad was originally described in 1875. It grows to about 2.75 cm, with females almost always being larger than males. The back of the toad is black with yellow spots and stripes. The lower ventral area is black with red markings, and the feet are typically solid red except for the hind toes. These ventral red spots can extend to the dorsum, particularly in females. Markings are highly variable and it is rare for any of them to be symmetrical.

They were first discovered in Córdoba, Argentina. Bumblebee toads are primarily found in Paraguay and Argentina, but have been occasionally observed in Uruguay and Brazil. Their range may also extend into Bolivia.

Diet 
The bumblebee toad's natural diet is made up of insects and worms. Melanphryniscus sp. are toxic in the wild. It is believed that these toxins are created from alkaloids found in their natural diet. The brightly colored pattern of bumblebee toads is an example of aposematism. In captivity, bumblebee toads are non-toxic.

References

stelzneri
Endemic fauna of Argentina
Amphibians of Argentina
Amphibians described in 1875
Taxonomy articles created by Polbot